Three United States Navy ships have borne the name USS Pike.

  was a wooden freshwater corvette built in Sackett's Harbor in 1813.  She saw action on Lake Ontario against the Royal Navy during the War of 1812.
  was a  commissioned 1903.
  was a Porpoise-class submarine commissioned in 1935.

United States Navy ship names